Stephen Immerwahr is an American bass guitarist and vocalist best known as a founding member of the slowcore group Codeine.

Biography
Stephen Immerwahr began his foray into music in 1988, originally serving as an assistant engineer to bands such as Soul Asylum and Living Colour. In 1989, Immerwahr formed Codeine with drummer Chris Brokaw and guitarist John Engle. Codeine pioneered the slowcore and sadcore subgenres of indie rock, but with a more experimental attitude than other bands in the genre, such as Low, Idaho and Red House Painters.  Codeine released their first album Frigid Stars LP on the German label Glitterhouse in August 1990. Codeine's final release was the full-length album The White Birch, released in May 1994. Following his work in Codeine, would later exit a career in music to become a research scientist.

In February 2012, Codeine announced they would perform on the request of Mogwai at All Tomorrow's Parties sister event, I'll Be Your Mirror, on 26 May 2012 in London, United Kingdom at Alexandra Palace, along with other shows, to commemorate a comprehensive reissue of their recordings by The Numero Group in June 2012. Codeine's final reunion show was at Le Poisson Rouge in New York on 15 July 2012.

References

External links

Living people
American rock bass guitarists
American male bass guitarists
American rock singers
Codeine (band) members
Slowcore musicians
Guitarists from Chicago
Guitarists from New York City
Year of birth missing (living people)